Kasak  is a 2020 Pakistani family drama television series aired on ARY Digital. It is directed by Kashif Saleem and Atif Rathore and written by Muhammad Maqsood. Produced by Humayun Saeed under Six Sigma Plus, it stars Junaid Khan and Iqra Aziz in leads.

This serial was shot somewhere in 2015-2016 however, its release was delayed and was telecasted in 2020. The serial received mix response from the viewers. It was also claimed that serial is copied from Hum Tv serial Tanhai that aired in 2013.

Cast
Javed Shaikh as Feroz
Junaid Khan as Daniyal
Iqra Aziz as Faryal
Ayesha Toor as Saniya
Seemi Pasha as Rabia
Khalid Malik as Arsalan
Fahima Awan as Naima
Jahanzeb Khan as Junaid
Salman Saeed as Shahwaiz
Birjees Farooqi as Firdous
Eman Zaidi as Manaal
Sidra Sajid as Sajida
Anees Haider as Shafeeq
Anmol Baloch as Saba
Iqra Faiz as Shanzay
Ayesha as Samra
Falak Shehzad as Shamakh
Aiman Zaman as Faryaal's friend (minor appearance)

References

ARY Digital original programming
2020 Pakistani television series debuts
2020 Pakistani television series endings